is a city in Kumamoto Prefecture, Japan.

As of March 31, 2017, the city has an estimated population of 59,928, with 23,724 households and a population density of 320 persons per km2. The total area is 188.56 km2.

The modern city of Uki was established on January 15, 2005, as a result of the merger between the towns of Misumi and Shiranuhi (both from Uto District), and the towns of Matsubase, Ogawa and Toyono (all from Shimomashiki District).

History

Events
2016 Kumamoto earthquake

Geography

Climate
Uki has a humid subtropical climate (Köppen climate classification Cfa) with hot, humid summers and cool winters. There is significant precipitation throughout the year, especially during June and July.

Demographics
Per Japanese census data, the population of Uki in 2020 is 57,032 people. Uki has been conducting censuses since 1950.

Tourism

Visitor attractions
Shiranui - atmospheric optical phenomenon.
Tofukuji - Takezaki Suenaga's (a samurai of Kamakura period) family temple. He was owner of Moko Shurai Ekotoba.

Notable people from Uki

Karina Maki, handball player
Seiichiro Maki, football player
Yuki Maki, football player
Kiichi Matsuda, educator of agriculture
Tetsuya Noda, contemporary artist
Haruki Uemura, former judo wrestler

References

External links
  

 
Cities in Kumamoto Prefecture
Port settlements in Japan
Populated coastal places in Japan